Conan: Hall of Volta (or simply Conan on the box cover and title screen) is a platform game from American developers Eric Robinson and Eric Parker and published by Datasoft in 1984.  It is based on the character Conan created by Robert E. Howard. This game was originally written for the Apple II and ported to the Commodore 64 and Atari 8-bit family.

Released in 1984, the game's launch coincided with the debut of the film Conan the Destroyer. The box shows a painting of Arnold Schwarzenegger as the muscle-bound warrior with his new costume for Destroyer.  Despite this attempted tie-in, the game has little to do with the movie other than the Cimmerian in the title role, having originally been designed as boomerang-throwing game titled Visigoth. One of the screenshots on the back of the box is from a prototype version and shows a boomerang instead of a sword.

Gameplay
The player controls Conan as he attacks the evil Volta in his castle fortress.  Conan is armed with 10 boomerang swords.  From time to time, Conan may be aided by an "Avian Ally" as he attempts to defeat Volta's sinister hordes, which included bats, scorpions, giant ants, fire-breathing dragons and floating eyeballs.

The game includes seven diverse levels requiring the player to navigate lava pits, geysers, spike pits, and floating platforms.  Along the way the player often needs to collect magic gems or keys in order to progress.

In the game, Conan does not jump, he somersaults. If he falls, he launches into a dive.

One original feature of the game's time was a close-up picture that would be shown upon the player's last death. For example, dying in the first level might show a close-up picture of a bat with the caption "bats in your belfry". Deaths in other levels would yield a picture of a hazard unique to that level:

Bats in your belfry
Only a cleric can help you now
Quest terminated (spike pit)
There is no glory for you here
To be continued
A watery barrier
You shuffle off defeated for now

Reception

Localizations
In Bulgaria, where Conan the Barbarian was generally unknown, the Apple II version was translated into Bulgarian and distributed by ZMD Pazarjik under the name "Добрия рицар" (The Good Knight).

References

1984 video games
Apple II games
Atari 8-bit family games
Commodore 64 games
Datasoft games
FM-7 games
NEC PC-8801 games
Sharp X1 games
Cancelled ZX Spectrum games
U.S. Gold games
Video games based on Conan the Barbarian
Video games developed in the United States
Single-player video games